The Chalvignac Group is an international industrial company. Its headquarters is located in Jarnac-Champagne, Charente-Maritime, France. Global specialist of distillation processes, this group is also proposing agricultural and wine-growing trailers, stainless steel/fiber tanks and has recently extended its activity to the winery equipment retailing. Created in the early 20th century, the main company Chalvignac became the center of the Nov-Tech group in 1984, to be renamed recently as the Chalvignac Group.

Know-hows

Boilermaking

Distillation

Chalvignac's core business is the pot still manufacturing. This apparatus is necessary for cognac's distillation, emblematic spirit of the area where is implemented the subsidiary in charge of pot stills conception and manufacturing: Chalvignac Prulho Distillation. Its flagship product is the traditional “charentais” pot still, enabling to distil not only cognac, but also calvados, Armagnac, rum, tequila, whiskey and other brandies. Furthermore, Chalvignac Prulho Distillation manufactures distillation columns to obtain mainly Armagnac and single distilled alcohols in continuous production. Alongside this traditional activity, Chalvignac designs and produces high-technology automatisms, to set and supervise the distillation process: gas/steam supply setting and distillate's casting (heads, brouillis/hearts and tails) and temperature regulation by water cooling.

Among its clients are prestigious cognac brands as Hennessy, Martell, Courvoisier...

Tanks

Tanks production is allocated through three subsidiaries, some tanks are manufactures for wineries and spirits, notably Moët & Chandon, but also for industrial groups, producing other food and non-food liquids.

Wine-growing and stocking tanks in stainless steel are manufactured by Chalvignac at Jarnac-Champagne workshop.

Wine-growing and stocking tanks in composite materials by the Sodipia subsidiary, located at St-Médard de Mussidan, Dordogne.

Industrial stainless steel tanks for other purposes than wine-growing, as foodstuffs (chocolate) and non-food goods (cosmetics) are manufactured by the Dabrigeon subsidiary, located at Pérignac, Charente-Maritime.

Trailers
In addition to its Boilermaking activity, the Chalvignac Group has recently acquired companies specialized in trailers manufacturing.

The first to integrate the Chalvignac Group was Simonneau C.C.M., located at Sainte-Même, Charente-Maritime. This branch is specialized in the production of agricultural trailers and wine-press holders.

Then, Chalvignac took over the company Maitre. Recently acquired by the group, this branch is located in Rongères, Allier, and produces agricultural trailers, trays and manure spreaders.

Shops

Mainly aiming at professionals, Chalvignac Equipements, founded in 1991, offers wine-growing tools, wine-stocking tanks and pumps...

Chalvignac-Prulho stills for small, boutique and experimental distilling of liquor products are distributed in South Africa through Distillique. They also provide training on Chalvignac-Prulho stills and general distilling

External links
 
Chalvignac Group on Europages

Bibliography

Manufacturing companies of France